The president of the Parliament is the presiding officer of the Parliament of Moldova. The current president of the Parliament is Igor Grosu since 29 July 2021.

History

Moldavian Democratic Republic

Moldavian Autonomous Soviet Socialist Republic
Chairmen of the Central Executive Committee of the Moldavian ASSR:

Moldavian Soviet Socialist Republic
Chairmen of the Supreme Soviet of the Moldavian SSR:

Parliament of the Republic of Moldova
On 5 June 1990, the Moldavian SSR (RSS Moldovenească) changed its name to Soviet Socialist Republic of Moldova (RSS Moldova). Subsequently, on 23 May 1991 it adopted the name Republic of Moldova (Republica Moldova).

Presidents of the Parliament of the Republic of Moldova:

Sources

 
Political history of Moldova
Lists of Moldovan politicians
Moldova